Medway Maritime Hospital is a general hospital in Gillingham, England within the NHS South East Coast. It is run by Medway NHS Foundation Trust. It is Kent's largest and busiest hospital, dealing with around 400,000 patients annually. It was founded as the Royal Naval Hospital in 1902 for the Naval personnel at the Chatham Dockyard. The hospital was where the Piano Man was taken after being found wandering in a soaking wet suit and tie.

History

The hospital was built as a replacement Royal Naval Hospital for the 252 bed Melville Hospital (Naval), which was not large enough to deal with the increasing numbers of Naval personnel moving into Chatham; it was opened by King Edward VII on 26 July 1905. At that time the main corridor was almost 1,000 feet long. The hospital's large Grade II listed water tower, which acts as a local landmark over Gillingham, was built around the same time. On 15 January 1961 the hospital was transferred by the Admiralty to the NHS and became part of the Medway Health Authority. The hospital closed for modernisation, and after some delays, opened again in 1965 under the name "Medway Hospital". After a £60 million development in 1999, the hospital changed its name to "Medway Maritime Hospital" and services were transferred from neighbouring hospitals St Bartholomew's in Rochester and All Saints' in Chatham.

Services
Medway Maritime Hospital has 588 beds in 29 wards under five main departments: accident and emergency, adult medicine, surgery and anaesthetics, children and women, clinical support services.
 Under an ongoing and regularly updated NHS survey, the quality of service is regarded as "fair", with 96% of patients waiting less than 18 weeks for treatment. The hospital is run by the Medway NHS Foundation Trust, one of four hospital trusts in Kent. The trust employs over 3,500 staff. The trust's main focus is running the Medway Maritime Hospital.

Emergency and elective abdominal aortic aneurysm repairs were moved from the hospital to Kent and Canterbury Hospital in February 2020 because of staff shortages.

Hospital Radio Medway
Medway Hospital Radio was formed in 1970. The radio station has over 45 volunteers and 2 broadcast studios located in the basement of the hospital. It broadcasts to all the wards in the hospital. The radio station officially went live on the Hospital website at the end of 2017. All hospicoms in the wards within the building have now been removed as of 2018. WiFi has now been installed in the hospital for the use of the public.

The Piano Man

An unidentified man who became known as "Piano Man" was treated at Medway Hospital during April 2005. The man was found wandering the streets in Sheerness, wearing a soaking wet suit and tie. Despite many attempts to communicate with him, he remained silent. When given a pen and paper he drew a grand piano. When taken to a piano in the hospital chapel, it was reported he played classical music non-stop for four hours, however this was not the case as hospital staff afterwards stated he just played with the piano like someone with no training.
 After four months he revealed his identity as Andreas Grassl from Bavaria, and he returned home.

See also
 Healthcare in Kent
 List of hospitals in England

References

External links 

 Trust website
 Medway Maritime Hospital on the NHS website
 Inspection reports from the Care Quality Commission

Hospital buildings completed in 1905
Hospitals in Kent
Gillingham, Kent
NHS hospitals in England
Military hospitals in the United Kingdom
1905 establishments in England